Arthur M. Amundsen (22 March 1886 – 25 February 1936) was a Norwegian gymnast who competed in the 1908 Summer Olympics and in the 1912 Summer Olympics. As a member of the Norwegian team, he won a silver medal in the gymnastics team event in 1908. Four years later he was part of the Norwegian team, which won the bronze medal in the gymnastics team, Swedish system event.

References

External links
Arthur Amundsen's profile at databaseOlympics

1886 births
1936 deaths
Norwegian male artistic gymnasts
Gymnasts at the 1908 Summer Olympics
Gymnasts at the 1912 Summer Olympics
Olympic gymnasts of Norway
Olympic silver medalists for Norway
Olympic bronze medalists for Norway
Olympic medalists in gymnastics
Medalists at the 1912 Summer Olympics
Medalists at the 1908 Summer Olympics
20th-century Norwegian people